The 2008 Volleyball America's Cup was the seventh edition of the annual men's volleyball tournament, played by six countries from North, Central and South America. The tournament was held from September 24 to September 28, 2008 in Cuiabá, Brazil.

Competing Nations

Squads

First round

Pool A

September 24, 2008

September 25, 2008

September 26, 2008

Pool B

September 24, 2008

September 25, 2008

September 26, 2008

Final round

September 27, 2008

September 28, 2008

Final standings

Awards
Best Scorer
 Roberlandy Simon
Best Spiker
 Roberlandy Simon
Best Blocker
 Éder Carbonera
Best Server
 Evan Patak
Best Setter
 Bruno Rezende
Best Receiver
 Sérgio Dutra Santos
Best Digger
 Martín Meana
Best Libero
 Sérgio Dutra Santos

References
 Results

Volleyball America's Cup
A
A
Volleyball